Martin Hruška (born 11 May 1981) is a Czech football winger who plays for Zlín.

External links

1981 births
Living people
Czech footballers
Association football midfielders
Czech First League players
FC Spartak Trnava players
FC Viktoria Plzeň players
FK Teplice players
FC ViOn Zlaté Moravce players
Slovak Super Liga players
FK Baník Most players
Czech expatriate sportspeople in Slovakia
Expatriate footballers in Slovakia